Stony Batioja (born 30 April 1964) is an Ecuadorian footballer. He played in three matches for the Ecuador national football team from 1987 to 1991. He was also part of Ecuador's squad for the 1991 Copa América tournament.

References

External links
 

1964 births
Living people
Ecuadorian footballers
Ecuador international footballers
Place of birth missing (living people)
Association football forwards